Dave Sullivan (born December 29, 1964, in Chicago) is a former Illinois State Senator. He is a member of the Republican Party. He was first appointed in 1998 to fill a vacancy following the death of former State Senator Marty Butler. He was subsequently re-elected in 2000 and 2002. He has a Bachelor of Arts in Political Science from Marquette University.

He resigned in September 2005 and did not run for re-election in the 2006 state elections stating that his salary would not cover the cost of sending his four children to Marquette University.

During the 2008 Republican Party presidential primaries, Sullivan worked on behalf of the presidential campaign of former U.S. Senator Fred Thompson as a congressional district chair for Illinois's 9th congressional district.

References

External links

Living people
1964 births
Republican Party Illinois state senators
People from Park Ridge, Illinois
Marquette University alumni
Politicians from Chicago